Tanya Michelle Chisholm (born July 1, 1983) is an American actress and dancer. She is mostly known for her role as Kelly Wainwright on the Nickelodeon comedy series, Big Time Rush, and comedy film Big Time Movie. also played Marcie on the Legally Blonde spin off, Legally Blondes (otherwise known as Legally Blonde 3) alongside the film's stars, Camilla and Rebecca Rosso. She has guest-starred in shows including Cory in the House, Ghost Whisperer, and Cold Case. She also had a recurring role on Veronica Mars. Chisholm has also appeared in YouTube group, WongFuProduction's, videos such as Linappropriate, Chester See's sketch production called I Glove You, and David Choi's music video for "Won't Even Start" as an extra.

Career
Tanya Chisholm is a graduate of the UCLA School of Theatre, Film, and Television.

Chisholm is best known for playing the main 'Sharpette', Jackie, in the Disney movie High School Musical 2; the only Sharpette to appear in the film's main credits. Chisholm has done other work for Disney, including a guest role on Cory in the House, and has a supporting role in the movie Fired Up!.

Chisholm has also appeared in television series such as Veronica Mars (recurring), Ghost Whisperer (guest star), and Cold Case (guest star).  She starred as Kelly Wainwright in Nickelodeon's hit series Big Time Rush. She had a recurring role in Legally Blondes (2009) as Marcie, one of Izzy and Annie's scholarship-provided friends.

Chisholm appeared in David Choi's music video "Won't Even Start" directed by Wong Fu Productions on YouTube. She appeared in the cast of Big Time Rush's Season 2 introduction scene. She also appeared in CeeLo Green"s music video "Cry Baby". She was also featured in 3 shorts from YouTubers Wong Fu Productions called The End of Wong Fu: A Christmas Story, Two Weeks Later: Resolution Fails and Linappropriate. Chisholm has been featured in Chester See's sketch production, I Glove You.

She also appears in Adam Lambert's music video "For Your Entertainment" as a dancer.

Filmography

Film

Television

References

External links 

1983 births
American film actresses
American television actresses
Living people
21st-century American actresses
African-American actresses
Actresses from Fort Lauderdale, Florida
21st-century African-American women
21st-century African-American people
20th-century African-American people
20th-century African-American women